Elaine Proctor (born 1960) is a South African film director, screenwriter, novelist, and actress. Her film Friends was entered into the 1993 Cannes Film Festival, where it won the Caméra d'Or Special Distinction.

Proctor attended the National Film and Television School, where she studied under director Mike Leigh. Her graduation film, On the Wire, won the school's Sutherland Trophy. Proctor has also written two novels. Her second novel, Savage Hour, was shortlisted for the 2015 Barry Ronge Fiction Prize.

Filmography
 Game for Vultures (1979)
Sharpeville Spirit (1986)
 We Will See/Re tla bona (1987)
 On the Wire (1990)
 Friends (1993)
 Kin (2000)

Fiction
 Rhumba (2011) 
 Savage Hour (2015)

References

External links
Official website

"Elaine Proctor on The Savage Hour: trying to give goodness a shape", The Irish Times, 22 May 2015.

1960 births
Living people
South African film directors
South African women film directors
South African screenwriters
20th-century South African women writers
South African film actresses
People from Johannesburg
20th-century South African actresses
21st-century South African women writers
20th-century South African writers
21st-century South African writers